The Kentish Flats Offshore Wind Farm is a wind farm located off the coast of Kent, England on a large, flat and shallow plateau just outside the main Thames shipping lanes. The wind farm is operated by Vattenfall.

Location

Installation

Construction was completed in August 2005, with commissioning and testing of all turbines completed by September 2005.  The wind farm consists of 30 Vestas V90-3MW wind turbines with a total nameplate capacity of 90 MW.  Turbines were installed by the Danish offshore wind farms services provider A2SEA. Between 2007 and 2010, the capacity factor was around 30%. Its levelised cost has been estimated at £66/MWh.

Power is transmitted to shore via three export cables.

Kentish Flats extension
In February 2013 Vattenfall was granted consent to extend the existing Kentish Flats Offshore Wind Farm. 15 turbines each with a capacity of 3.3 MW were installed adding an extra 49.5 MW to the wind farm. Offshore construction began in October 2014 and was operational by December 2015.

See also

Wind power in the United Kingdom
List of offshore wind farms
List of offshore wind farms in the United Kingdom
List of offshore wind farms in the North Sea

References

External links

LORC Knowledge - Datasheet for Kentish Flats
 Kentish Flats Offshore Wind Farm, Vattenfall
 Kentish Flats Extension, Vattenfall
 Operational Energy Projects, The Crown Estates

Offshore wind farms in the North Sea
Wind farms in England
Buildings and structures in Kent
Power stations in South East England
Vattenfall wind farms
Round 1 offshore wind farms
2005 establishments in England
Energy infrastructure completed in 2005